is a song by Japanese singer songwriter Mai Kuraki. It was written by Kuraki, Yue Mochizuki and Akira Onozuka. The song was released on April 11, 2011 to support victims of the 2011 Tōhoku earthquake and tsunami in Japan. The proceedings were donated to the Japanese Red Cross Society to benefit the victims.

The song was later released as "Anata ga Irukara (Fantasy on Ice 2011 version)". It features messages from Kuraki and the Japanese figure skater Shizuka Arakawa. The version was also released as video single. The video features Arakawa's and Kuraki's performance at the annual touring show Fantasy on Ice in Japan.

Track listing

Release history

References

2011 Tōhoku earthquake and tsunami relief
Charity singles
2011 singles
Mai Kuraki songs
Songs written by Mai Kuraki
J-pop songs
2011 songs
Songs about the 2011 Tōhoku earthquake and tsunami
Fantasy on Ice